John Poulett, 2nd Baron Poulett DL (1615 – 15 September 1665), of Hinton St George in Somerset, was an English peer and Member of Parliament who fought on the Royalist side during the English Civil War.

The son of John Poulett, 1st Baron Poulett (1585–1649), he was knighted in 1635 and elected to the Long Parliament as Member for Somerset in 1640, but was ejected for his Royalist sympathies in 1642. In 1643 he was awarded the degree of Doctor of Medicine at Exeter College, Oxford. During the war he first commanded a regiment in Munster, but after peace was temporarily concluded in Ireland brought his troops to England, where they formed part of the garrison of Winchester Castle until it surrendered. His first marriage was to Catherine, daughter of Lord Vere and widow of Oliver St John, which proved fortunate as her sister was married to the Parliamentary leader Lord Fairfax: at the end of the war Poulett was fined £9,400 for his activities, but he was discharged having paid only £1,800 "out of respect to the Lord General".

Sir John succeeded his father in the peerage in 1649. He went into exile abroad in 1658, but returned after the Restoration.

Notes

References
 
 
 
 

|-

1615 births
1665 deaths
2
Deputy Lieutenants of Somerset
English MPs 1640–1648
Cavaliers
Alumni of Exeter College, Oxford
Burials at the Poulett mausoleum, Church of St George (Hinton St George)
John, 2nd Baron